Sorabji Hormasji Munchersha Colah  (22 September 1902 – died 11 September 1950) was an Indian cricketer who played two Test matches during the 1930s.

Born and educated in Bombay, Colah showed promise at a young age as a good strokeplayer and brilliant fielder. He was one of the players who appeared for India in their first Test in 1932. He made 1,069 runs in the tour, including 900 in first-class matches, but did not have a good relationship with the captain CK Nayudu and it is recorded that on the way back, Colah threatened to throw Nayudu overboard. He also played in the Bombay Gymkhana Test when England toured India the next year. His other important appearances were against the Australian Services XI in 1935 and Lionel Tennyson team in 1937.

He represented Western India States and Nawanagar in the Ranji Trophy and was the captain of the Parsis in the Bombay Pentangular.

References

 Wisden obituary

External links

Indian cricketers
India Test cricketers
Parsees cricketers
Mumbai cricketers
Saurashtra cricketers
Western India cricketers
Parsi people from Mumbai
1950 deaths
1902 births
Cricketers from Mumbai
Roshanara Club cricketers